Louisburg High School may refer to:
Louisburg High School (Kansas)
Louisburg High School (North Carolina), part of the Franklin Count Schools school district